Breitung may refer to:

 Edward Breitung, American politician
 Breitung Township, Michigan
 Breitung Township, Minnesota
 Breitung Hotel

See also
 Breitungen, Thuringia, Germany
 Breitungen, Saxony-Anhalt, Germany